Austria competed at the 2004 Summer Olympics in Athens, Greece from 13 to 29 August 2004. 74 competitors, 54 men and 20 women, took part in 56 events in 18 sports.

Medalists

Athletics 

Austrian athletes have so far achieved qualifying standards in the following athletics events (up to a maximum of 3 athletes in each event at the 'A' Standard, and 1 at the 'B' Standard).

Men
Track & road events

Combined events – Decathlon

Women
Track & road events

Canoeing

Austria entered one competitor in each of the men's and women's divisions of the individual kayak slalom event.  Both qualified for the semifinals, but in that race neither was among the top ten that advanced to the final.

Slalom

Cycling

Road

Track
Omnium

Mountain biking

Diving 

Women

Equestrian

Dressage

Eventing

"#" indicates that the score of this rider does not count in the team competition, since only the best three results of a team are counted.

Fencing

Men

Judo

Rowing

Men

Qualification Legend: FA=Final A (medal); FB=Final B (non-medal); FC=Final C (non-medal); FD=Final D (non-medal); FE=Final E (non-medal); FF=Final F (non-medal); SA/B=Semifinals A/B; SC/D=Semifinals C/D; SE/F=Semifinals E/F; R=Repechage

Sailing

Men

Open

M = Medal race; OCS = On course side of the starting line; DSQ = Disqualified; DNF = Did not finish; DNS= Did not start; RDG = Redress given

Shooting 

Men

Women

* Lost in shoot-out

Swimming 

Austrian swimmers earned qualifying standards in the following events (up to a maximum of 2 swimmers in each event at the A-standard time, and 1 at the B-standard time):

Men

Women

Table tennis

Men

Taekwondo

Tennis

Triathlon

Volleyball

Beach

Weightlifting

Wrestling 

Men's freestyle

Women's freestyle

References

External links
Austrian Olympic Committee 

Nations at the 2004 Summer Olympics
2004
Summer Olympics